Falkland Historic District is a national historic district located at Falkland, Pitt County, North Carolina. The district encompasses 35 contributing buildings, 1 contributing site, and 1 contributing structure in the town of Falkland.  It includes buildings dated from about 1859 to 1960 and notable examples of Colonial Revival, Greek Revival, and Victorian style architecture. Notable buildings include the Dr. Peyton Hopkins Mayo House (c. 1859), Dr. Jenness Morrill House (c. 1900), Sellars Mark Crisp House (c. 1905), David Morrill House (c. 1948), Falkland Presbyterian Church (1923) and adjoining cemetery, former Fire Station (c. 1960), Kinchen Robert Wooten Store (1936-1937), and Pittman Building (1951).

It was listed on the National Register of Historic Places in 2012.

References

Historic districts on the National Register of Historic Places in North Carolina
Colonial Revival architecture in North Carolina
Greek Revival architecture in North Carolina
Victorian architecture in North Carolina
Buildings and structures in Pitt County, North Carolina
National Register of Historic Places in Pitt County, North Carolina